

The Colorado History Museum was a museum in Denver, Colorado, United States dedicated to the history of Colorado. It was at 1300 Broadway in Denver from 1976 to 2010, and was administered by the Colorado Historical Society, now known as History Colorado. It closed on 28 March 2010, and the building was demolished in June to make way for a new Colorado Judicial Complex. The replacement museum, the History Colorado Center, was constructed one block to the south.

See also
 History of Colorado

References

External links
Museum website

Museums in Denver
Defunct museums in Colorado
Museums disestablished in 2010
History Colorado
1976 establishments in Colorado
Museums established in 1976
2010 disestablishments in Colorado
Demolished buildings and structures in Colorado
Buildings and structures demolished in 2010